Guilandina bonduc, commonly known as grey nicker, nicker bean, fever nut or knicker nut, is a species of flowering plant in the senna tribe, Caesalpinieae, that has a pantropical distribution. The stems are covered in curved spines. Its  grey seeds, known as nickernuts, are buoyant and durable enough to be dispersed by ocean currents.

Description
The stems are irregularly covered with curved prickles.

Distribution and habitat
Guilandina bonduc has a pantropical distribution. It typically grows near the coast, in scrub, on sand dunes and on the upper shore. It also occurs inland, in lowland secondary forest and disturbed areas near villages; this may be the result of the seed being accidentally dropped after being transported for medical purposes or for use as counters in board games. The seeds are buoyant and retain their viability in both fresh and sea water, enabling them to disperse to new coastal locations. When washed up on the shore, they are sometimes known as sea pearls.

Uses
Nodules on the plant's roots contain symbiotic bacteria that fixes nitrogen. This is used as a nutrient by the vine and also benefits other plants growing in close proximity. 

This plant has been used in traditional medicine. The seeds have tonic and antipyretic properties and the bark and leaves have been used to lower fevers. An oil extracted from the seeds has been used in cosmetics and for treating discharges from the ear.

References

External links

 

Caesalpinieae
Plants described in 1832
Pantropical flora
Flora of Nepal